Ivan Gologanov was a Bulgarian folklorist and ethnographer.

Biography 
Ivan Iliev Gologanov was a Bulgarian National Revival activist, a brother of Theodosius Gologanov. Gologanov himself was fluent in ancient and modern Greek, he knew the Hellenic mythology in details. Gologanov became a collaborator of the pan-Slavic ethnographer and folklorist Stjepan Verković and is considered to be the author of the collection "Veda Slovena". At the request of Verkovic he collected folk songs, fairy tales, legends, etc., interrupting his work as Bulgarian teacher in the village of Krushevo. This had been going on for 12 years. However Verkovic issued the collected songs under his own name. This sensational Slavic Veda contained “Bulgarian folk songs of the pre-historical and pre-Christian times, discovered in Thrace and Macedonia”. The aim of Gologanov was to prove the ancient inhabitants of Thrace and Macedonia were not Hellenic but Slav-Bulgarian. In 1891 the Prime Minister Stefan Stambolov, offered Gologanov to move to Sofia and promising him a pension, but he refused. At the same time Verkovic came to Bulgaria desperated by the increasing distrust of the "Veda Slovena". With the cooperation of government, he undertook two trips in the Rhodopes, trying to prove its authenticity, but his mission failed. Today analysts deny the credibility of Veda Slovena.

In 1893 Atanas Shopov - general secretary of the Bulgarian Exarchate in Istanbul wrote about him:

Notes 

1835 births
1895 deaths
People from Kato Nevrokopi
Bulgarian folklorists
Bulgarian ethnographers
Macedonian Bulgarians
Members of the Bulgarian Orthodox Church